The first encirclement campaign against the Honghu Soviet was an encirclement campaign launched by the Chinese Nationalist Government that was intended to destroy the communist Honghu Soviet and its Chinese Red Army in the local region.  It was responded by the Communists'  first counter-encirclement campaign at Honghu Soviet, also called by the communists as the first counter-encirclement campaign at Honghu Revolutionary Base, in which the local Chinese Red Army successfully defended their soviet republic in the southern Hubei and northern Hunan provinces against the Nationalist attacks from early December 1930 to the end of January 1931.

See also
List of battles of the Chinese Civil War
National Revolutionary Army
People's Liberation Army
History of the People's Liberation Army
Chinese Civil War

References
Military History Research Department, Complete History of the People's Liberation Army, Military Science Publishing House in Beijing, 2000, 

Campaigns of the Chinese Civil War
1930 in China
1931 in China